Golf ball sponge may refer to several different species of sea sponges:

 Any of the species in the genus Tetillidae, found throughout the world
 Tethya aurantium, found off the southern African coast
 Tethya samaaii, the red golf ball sponge, found off the western coast of South Africa